Koson District is a district of Qashqadaryo Region in Uzbekistan. The capital lies at the city Koson. The district consists of one city (Koson), 14 urban-type settlements (Boygʻundi, Boyterak, Guvalak, Istiqlol, Qoʻyi Obron, Mudin, Oqtepa, Obod, Pudina, Poʻlati, Rahimsoʻfi, Surhon, Toʻlgʻa, Esaboy) and 9 rural communities.

References

Qashqadaryo Region
Districts of Uzbekistan